Nii Osae Osae Dade (born December 29, 1993) is a Ghanaian entrepreneur and a computer scientist. He is the co-founder and director of both Mazzuma and Utopia Technologies: two companies in the digital commerce space for emerging markets. He is the Director of Software engineering for  Mazzuma.

Early life and education 
Nii Osae was born in Ghana and had his secondary education at the Presbyterian Boys Senior High School,Legon. He further studied BSc Computer Science at the University of Ghana

Career 
Nii Osae is also the board chairman of the Artificial Intelligence Association Ghana and a member of the Astronomical Society of Ghana and he was a speaker at the Tech in Ghana Conference, NVIDIA GTC 21, Global Webinar Series on AI in Finance.

In 2013, Nii Osae  co-founded CYST, a software innovation company specializing in Artificial Intelligence, Blockchain, and mobile payment systems to improve financial inclusion in emerging markets through its flagship product called Mazzuma and processes transactional volumes.

Recognition 
Nii Osae was recognized in the Forbes 30 Under 30 Technology category. He was part of the IBM/Airtel Mini Mobile Innovations Competition to develop smart innovations using telecommunications.

References 

1993 births
Living people
Ghanaian computer scientists
Ghanaian company founders
Businesspeople from Accra
University of Ghana alumni
21st-century Ghanaian businesspeople